is a professional Japanese baseball player. He plays pitcher for the Saitama Seibu Lions.

References 

1995 births
Living people
Baseball people from Okinawa Prefecture
Japanese baseball players
Nippon Professional Baseball pitchers
Saitama Seibu Lions players